The Other Man can refer to:

 The Other Man (1964 TV programme), a television play
 The Other Man (1916 film), a film starring Fatty Arbuckle
 The Other Man (1973 film), Egyptian drama film
 The Other Man (2008 film), a film starring Laura Linney, Liam Neeson and Antonio Banderas
 "The Other Man" (Kipling story) (1888), a short story by Rudyard Kipling
 "The Other Man" (song) (2001), a song by Canadian rock band Sloan